The men's 1500 metres event at the 1985 IAAF World Indoor Games was held at the Palais Omnisports Paris-Bercy on 18 and 19 January.

Medalists

Results

Heats
First 4 of each heat qualified directly (Q) for the final.

Final

References

1500
1500 metres at the World Athletics Indoor Championships